Tmesisternus luteostriatus is a species of beetle in the family Cerambycidae. It was described by Karl Borromaeus Maria Josef Heller in 1912.

References

luteostriatus
Beetles described in 1912